Gergovia is an extinct genus of sea snail, a marine gastropod mollusk in the family Cancellariidae, the nutmeg snails.

Species
 † Gergovia laticostata (Tenison-Woods, 1880) (Miocene, Victoria, Australia)
 † Gergovia petiti Barros & S. Lima, 2007
Species brought into synonymy
 Gergovia haswelli Garrard, 1975: synonym of Microsveltia haswelli (Garrard, 1975) (original combination)  † Gergovia platypleura (Tate, 1898): synonym of † Gergovia laticostata'' (Tenison-Woods, 1880)

References 

 Hemmen, J. (2007). Recent Cancellariidae. Annotated and illustrated catalogue of Recent Cancellariidae. Privately published, Wiesbaden. 428 pp.

External links
 Cossmann, M. (1899). Essais de paléoconchologie comparée. Troisième livraison. Paris, The author and Comptoir Géologique. 201 pp., 8 pls

Cancellariidae
Gastropod genera